Irini Merkouri (born in Ilion, Athens, on May 26, 1981) is a Greek pop and laïka singer of Romani origin.

Career

Early life

Merkouri was born and raised in Ilion, Athens to Hellenized-Romani parents. She began showing interest in being a singer at a very young age and at the age of seven she would mimic all the singers she would see on television.

2001 - 2003: Debut Album & Meine Mazi Mou Apopse

Irini Merkouri signed a contract with Sony Music Greece and recorded her first solo album Na Fysai I Anixi in November 2001. As part of this album she sang a duet with Antonis Remos titled "Dio Mas" and a Greek version of the French song "Si Tu Ouvres Tes Bras" titled "Iparhi Kai Theos". The album included a total of twelve songs including the hits "Syntelia" and "Foties Anapste".

In June 2003, Merkouri released her second studio album, titled Mine Mazi Mou Apopse (Stay With Me Tonight). It consisted of 12 songs and included a remix of "Syntelia" which topped the airplay charts for 3 consecutive months. The album also included the hits "Ematha Na Zo Horis Esena" and "Meine Mazi Mou Apopse".

2004: Sarbel & Palirroia

In 2004, Merkouri was featured in Sarbel's "Se Pira Sovara". In the same CD Single, Merkouri and Sarbel also released a second duet called "Agapi Mou Esi".

In June 2004, Merkouri released her third studio album, titled Palirroia, which contained 15 new songs. The first single to hit the airwaves was "Ela", a song with a mix of both modern laika and ragga elements. The second single, "Pou Na Fantasto" became the first video clip of the album and was a big hit at clubs throughout Greece. The third single, "Krata Me Ksana", was written by Takis Damashis of C:Real and with his help Merkouri won the Arion Award for "Best Pop Singer".

2005 - 2009: Aneta, Argises, & "Nai"

On July 7, 2005, Merkouri released her fourth studio album, titled Aneta (Comfortably). It featured hits from her previous albums and also contained 7 new songs."

The year 2006 brought Merkouri's fifth studio album, titled Argises (You Were Late). It contained 13 new songs including the hits "Pame Gi'Alla" and "Miso Lepto" which became a video clip. Christos Pazis performs a duet with Merkouri called "Argises".

Merkouri finished off 2007 with the release of a CD single titled "Nai" (Yes). It contained two songs "Nai" and "Kane Ena Tsigaro". "Nai" was made into a video clip, and the single reached the second place on the IFPI Singles Chart for Greece.

Shortly after, Merkouri recorded a new album in the studio with Sony BMG Greece. After internal disagreements with Sony BMG, Merkouri reportedly severed ties with label in 2009, and it is unknown what will happen with the unreleased material. Merkori signed with newly established label E.DI.EL. in 2009, which later re-branded to 4Music. In mid-2009, Merkouri digitally released the song "Parakseno Agori".

Discography

Albums
2002: Na Fysai I Anixi
2003: Mine Mazi Mou Apopse
2004: Palirroia
2005: Aneta
2006: Argises

CD Singles
2007: "Nai"

References

External links
Official Site
Fan Club
Biography (in Greek)

1981 births
Living people
Greek laïko singers
21st-century Greek women singers
Greek pop singers
Greek Romani people
Singers from Athens
Sony Music Greece artists
Romani singers